Ngagung Tso is a lake in Baxoi County, Chamdo Prefecture, Tibet Autonomous Region, China, to the north of Rakwa Tso. The lake's length is 3.9 km, maximum width 2.1 km, average width 1.6 km. It covers an area of 6.1 km2. Parlung River flows out of the lake.

Lakes of Tibet